This is a list of Persepolis F.C.s results at the  IPL 2008-09, 2009 ACL and 2008-09 Hazfi Cup . The club is competing in the Iran Pro League, Hazfi Cup and Asian Champions League.

Squad

Iran Pro League

Persian Gulf Cup

Matches

Last updated Apr 26 2009

Results by round

Results summary

League standings

Top scorers

Goal scorers

11
  Ibrahima Touré

9
  Alireza Vahedi Nikbakht
  Karim Bagheri

5
  Ali Karimi

4
  Maziar Zare

3
  Pejman Nouri

2
  Hadi Norouzi

1
  Mohsen Khalili
  Hossein Badamaki
  Mohammad Mansouri
  Sepehr Heidari
  Nabiollah Bagheriha
  Paulo Roberto do Carmo
  Ivan Petrović

Assists

9
  Ivan Petrović

6
  Ali Karimi

5
  Alireza Vahedi Nikbakht

4
  Karim Bagheri

1
  Mohammad Mansouri
  Pejman Nouri
  Alireza Mohammad
  Mojtaba Shiri
  Sepehr Heidari
  Hamidreza Ali Asgari
  Ibrahima Touré
  Paulo Roberto do Carmo

Cards

Matches played 
28
  Pejman Noori

26
  Sepehr Heidari

Hazfi Cup 2008-09

Scorers in Hazfi Cup 2008/09

Last updated Dec 9 2008

Goalscorers

1
  Hadi Norouzi
  Hamidreza Ali Asgari
  Maziar Zare
  Bahador Abdi
  Ibrahima Touré

Goalassistants

1
  Ziaeddin Niknafs
  Mojtaba Shiri
  Ibrahima Touré

Cards

Scorers in 2008-09 season 

Last updated Apr 16 2008

Goalscorers 

12
  Ibrahima Touré

9
  Karim Bagheri
  Alireza Vahedi Nikbakht

Goalassistants 

9
  Ivan Petrović

Asian Champions League 2009

Group B

Persepolis schedule ACL 2009

Group stage

Round of 16

Scorers in ACLeague 2009

Goalscorers 

2
  Alireza Vahedi Nikbakht
  Ali Karimi

1
  Hadi Norouzi
  Maziar Zare
  Mohsen Khalili
  Ibrahima Touré

Goalassistants 
1
  Alireza Vahedi Nikbakht
  Mojtaba Shiri
  Alireza Mohammad
  Ibrahima Touré
  Ivan Petrović

Cards

Friendlies
4 September 2008
Persepolis 4-0 Naft Tehran
Pejman Nouri 

9 November 2008
Persepolis 6-0 Armin Tehran

16 November 2008
Persepolis 1-0 Steel Azin
Hamidreza Ali Asgari 

24 December 2008
Persepolis 4-2 Sazan Rah Qom 
Ivan Petrović 
Hadi Norouzi 
Farhad Kheirkhah 
Ibrahima Touré 

11 January 2009
Persepolis 8-0 Faraz Shemiran 
Ibrahima Touré 
Ibrahima Touré 
Ibrahima Touré 
Ibrahima Touré 
Hadi Norouzi 
Alireza Vahedi Nikbakht 
Hamidreza Ali Asgari 
Rahman Rezaei

Pre-season

Friendlies in Karegaran Stadium
Persepolis 2-1 Armin Tehran
Farhad Kheirkhah 
Hadi Norouzi 
Persepolis 1-1 Payam
Pejman Nouri 
Persepolis 1-0 Sepasi
Hamidreza Ali Asgari

UAE Camp (Dubai Iranian club)
In the middle of July the club programmed a camp in Spain, but it cancelled. after Ghotbi joined team, the club programmed a camp in Dubai from July 27 to July 31 replacing the Spain camp. After Persepolis was censured by Iran football medias because of this programming, censurers believed that Dubai hot temperature on July is not suitable for training, but Persepolis officials answered that the camp was so profitable for team. The camp included swimming, bodybuilding, players recreation and two friendly matches.

29 July 2008
Persepolis   4-0     Wind Dubai
Ibrahima Touré Farhad Kheirkhah   Ibrahima Touré  Ibrahima Touré  Sepehr Heidari 

30 July 2008
Persepolis    11-0    Fly Emirates 
Farhad Kheirkhah Farhad Kheirkhah Farhad Kheirkhah Farhad Kheirkhah Hossein Badamaki Hossein Badamaki Pejman Nouri Hadi Norouzi Franck Atsou  Masoud Zarei Masoud Zarei

Club

Kit 

|
|
|

Club managers

Club officials
{| class=wikitable
! Position   !!Name 
|-
|President ||  Abbas Ansarifard
|-
|Director ||  Mahmoud Khordbin
|-
|Academy President ||  Fereydoun Moeini
|-
|Media Officer & International Committee President||  Morteza Hosseinzadeh Zarabi
|-
|Financial  Officer ||   Ali Akbar Ashouri
|-
|Juridical Officer ||  Mostafa Shokripour
|-
|Cultural  Officer ||  Hojat'ol eslam Seyyed Mohammad Kohnegi
|-
|Chairman & Spokesman of board of Directors ||  Majid Farrokhzadi
|-

Captains 
1. Karim Bagheri <br/ >
2. Ali Karimi <br/ >
3. Pejman Nouri

Squad changes during 2008/09 season

In

Out

* He was fired from the club

References

2008-09
Iranian football clubs 2008–09 season